Rohwer, Arkansas is an unincorporated community in Desha County, Arkansas, United States. The community is located on Arkansas Highway 1.

History

The area was a Japanese internment camp, designed during World War II by the architect Edward F. Neild of Shreveport, Louisiana. The camp opened in March 1942. It is now the site of the Rohwer War Relocation Center.

Climate
The climate in this area is characterized by hot, humid summers and generally mild to cool winters.  According to the Köppen Climate Classification system, Rohwer has a humid subtropical climate, abbreviated "Cfa" on climate maps.

Education
The McGehee School District serves Rohwer.

Previously the Delta Special School District served Rohwer. The district had two schools, Delta Elementary School and Delta High School. In 2004 the Arkansas Legislature approved a law that forced school districts with fewer than 350 students apiece to consolidate with other districts. On July 1, 2004, the Delta Special district merged into the McGehee district. After the acquisition of the Delta Special School District, the McGehee district continued to operate Delta Elementary School and Delta High School. By October 2005 the Delta campus became elementary only. By October 2006 the Delta campus was no longer in operation.

Notable people
 Sheilla Lampkin, Arkansas state legislator, was born in Rohwer.
 George Takei, actor, lived as a child at the Rohwer War Relocation Center.

References

External links

Unincorporated communities in Desha County, Arkansas
Unincorporated communities in Arkansas